The Mixed doubles tournament of the 2012 BWF World Junior Championships was held from October 30 until November 3. Alfian Eko Prasetya and Gloria Emanuelle Widjaja were the defending champion.

Edi Subaktiar and Melati Daeva Oktavianti won the title after defeating the defending champion Alfian Eko Prasetya and his new partner Shella Devi Aulia 21-17, 21-13 in the final. It was the second straight years for Indonesia to make all-Indonesian final in the mixed doubles.

Seeded

  Choi Sol-gyu / Chae Yoo-jung (quarter-final)
  Edi Subaktiar / Melati Daeva Oktavianti (champion)
  Liu Yuchen / Chen Qingchen (semi-final)
  Wang Yilu / Huang Yaqiong (semi-final)
  Kim Jung-ho / Kim Ji-won (fourth round)
  Kasper Antonsen / Line Kjaersfeldt (fourth round)
  Jung Jae-wook / Shin Seung-chan (quarter-final)
  Tan Wee Gieen / Chow Mei Kuan (fourth round)
  Mark Lamsfuß / Franziska Volkmann (second round)
  Robin Tabeling / Myke Halkema (fourth round)
  Tom Wolfenden / Holly Smith (second round)
  Alfian Eko Prasetya / Shella Devi Aulia (final)
  Putra Eka Rhoma / Ni Ketut Mahadewi Istirani (quarter-final)
  Lee Chun Hei / Yuen Sin Ying (quarter-final)
  Alexandr Zinchenko / Olga Morozova (fourth round)
  Jaromir Janacek / Lucie Cerna (third round)

Draw

Finals

Top Half

Section 1

Section 2

Section 3

Section 4

Bottom Half

Section 5

Section 6

Section 7

Section 8

References
Main Draw (Archived 2013-07-13)

2012 BWF World Junior Championships
2012 in youth sport